Edgar Foxall (1906–1990) was an English poet whose work features in one of the Penguin poetry anthologies, Poetry of the Thirties (1964). Though notable for caustic political commentary and acute social observation, the natural world is a strong recurrent theme throughout his work.

Life and work 
Born near Ellesmere Port in Cheshire, Foxall left school at fourteen, working in a range of jobs (clerk, shop foreman, and part-time sports journalist) before training as a school teacher after World War II. Taking an active interest in local politics (he was a fervent supporter of the early Labour Party (UK)), Foxall was a prolific contributor to literary journals, magazines and the local and national press. In 1968, together with his wife Nancy, he moved to the North Wales resort town of Llandudno.

Foxall received encouragement through correspondence with both T. S. Eliot and John Masefield. He won critical acclaim from Leonard Clark, J. C. Squire and Cyril Connolly.

Published works 
Proems (1938)
Water Rat Sonata (1940)
Poems (1947)
Decade (1957)
The Limitations of Moonlight (1973)
Ultimate Harvest (1992)

A note on working class solidarity 
One of Foxall's most famous works, published in 1933:

Notes 

1906 births
1990 deaths
English male poets
20th-century English poets
People from Ellesmere Port
20th-century English male writers